Inocarpus is a small genus of flowering plants belonging to the subfamily Faboideae of the legume family, Fabaceae, and was recently assigned to the informal monophyletic Pterocarpus clade within the Dalbergieae.

Species
Inocarpus comprises three species distributed in Malesia.

 Inocarpus fagifer (Parkinson ex Zollinger) Fosberg—Tahitian chestnut

 Inocarpus glabellus Adema
 Inocarpus papuanus Kostermans

References

Dalbergieae
Fabaceae genera